The Kerala Prisons and Correctional Services is a state agency of Kerala that operates prisons and borstal schools. It has its headquarters in Thiruvananthapuram. The Kerala Prisons and Correctional Services is headed by the Director General of Prisons.

Organization 
The Kerala Prisons and Correctional Services is headed by the Director General, Prisons and Correctional Services who is of the rank of Director General of Police or Additional Director General of Police. Prisons Headquarters is situated at Poojappura, Thiruvananthapuram. The Director General of Prisons is assisted by Deputy Inspector Generals of Prisons at headquarters and by Deputy Inspector General of Prisons of South ,Central and North Zones. The head of the department is commonly an Indian Police Service Officer by deputation. The present Director General of Prisons is Balram Kumar Upadhyay IPS.

Hirarchy 
Director General, Prisons & Correctional Services (IPS Cadre)
Deputy Inspector General of Prisons
Superintendent, Central Prison & Correctional Home/Open Prison & Correctional Home/ High Security Prison
Joint Superintendent/Senior Lecturer, SICA/Superintendent of District Jail/Superintendent of Women Prison/ Superintendent, Women Open Prison
Deputy Superintendent/ Superintendent, Special Sub Jail/ Superintendent, Borstal School
Assistant Superintendent Grade-I / Superintendent, Sub Jail/ Armourer, SICA/ Training Officer, SICA/ Supervisor, Open Prison & Borstal School/ Store Keeper, Open Prison
Assistant Superintendent Grade-II/ Prison Officer/ Gate Keeper
Deputy Prison Officer / Chief Petty Officer
Assistant Prison Officer/Petty officer
Assistant Prison Officer Cum Driver

Prisons and Correctional Institutions

Central Prison & Correctional Homes 
Central Prisons & Correctional Centers are meant for confining persons sentenced to undergo imprisonment above 6 months, prisoners convicted by Court Martial, detenues and civil prisoners. There are four Central Prison & Correctional Homes, situated at Thiruvananthapuram, Thrissur, Malappuram and Kannur.

 Central Prison & Correctional Home, Poojappura,Thiruvananthapuram
 Central Prison & Correctional Home, Viyyur, Thrissur
 Central Prison & Correctional Home, Kannur, Pallikkunnu, Kannur
 Central Prison & Correctional Home, Tavanur, Malappuram

Other Prisons 

 Open Prisons = 3
 High Security Prisons = 1
 Women Prisons = 3
 District Jails = 13
 Special Sub Jails = 15
 Borstal schools = 1
 Sub Jails = 16

Insignia

Former Chiefs 
 Sudesh Kumar IPS
 Dr. Shaik Darvesh saheb IPS
 Rishiraj Singh IPS
 R Sreelekha IPS
 Anil Kant IPS
 T P Senkumar IPS
 Lokanath Behera IPS

See also 

 Prisons in India
 Department of Home (Kerala)
 Viyyur High Security Prison
 Viyyur Jail Park
 Poojapura Central Jail
 Kannur Central Prison

References 

State agencies of Kerala
Prison and correctional agencies